Chen Zirong (born 30 January 1998) is a Chinese footballer who currently plays for Chinese Super League club Guangzhou R&F.

Club career
Chen Zirong joined Chinese Super League side Guangzhou R&F's youth academy in 2012. He was loaned to Danish 1st Division side Vejle Boldklub in the summer of 2016. On 1 January 2017, he was promoted to the first team squad for the rest of 2016–17 season. Chen returned to Guangzhou R&F in July 2017. He was then loaned to Guangzhou R&F's satellite team R&F in the Hong Kong Premier League. On 30 December 2017, he made his senior debut in the first round of 2017–18 Hong Kong FA Cup which R&F lost to Yuen Long 4–0. He made his league debut on 9 March 2018 in a 5–0 away defeat to Eastern, coming on as a substitute for injury Zhou Yuchen in the 11th minute.

Career statistics
.

References

External links
 

1998 births
Living people
Association football goalkeepers
Chinese footballers
Vejle Boldklub players
R&F (Hong Kong) players
Footballers from Guangzhou
Hong Kong Premier League players
Chinese expatriate footballers
Expatriate men's footballers in Denmark
21st-century Chinese people